Abisara saturata is a butterfly in the family Riodinidae. It is found in the  Indomalayan realm.

Subspecies
A. s. saturata (Hainan)
A. s. amaga Fruhstorfer, 1914 (Bangka)
A. s. baraka Bennett, 1950 (Manipur)
A. s. corbeti Bennett, 1950 (Mindanao)
A. s. iliaca Fruhstorfer, 1912 (Nias)
A. s. kausambioides de Nicéville & Martin, [1896] (Peninsular Malaya, Langkawi, Singapore) — Malayan plum Judy
A. s. maya Bennet, 1950 (Myanmar, Thailand)
A. s. meta Fruhstorfer, 1904
A. s. paha Fruhstorfer, 1914 (north-eastern Sumatra)
A. s. tera Fruhstorfer, 1904 (northern Borneo)

References

Butterflies described in 1878
Abisara
Butterflies of Singapore
Butterflies of Indochina
Taxa named by Frederic Moore